Kim Sung-moon (born 16 March 1965) is a South Korean former wrestler who competed in the 1988 Summer Olympics and in the 1992 Summer Olympics.

References

External links
 

1965 births
Living people
Olympic wrestlers of South Korea
Wrestlers at the 1988 Summer Olympics
Wrestlers at the 1992 Summer Olympics
South Korean male sport wrestlers
Olympic silver medalists for South Korea
Olympic medalists in wrestling
Medalists at the 1988 Summer Olympics
20th-century South Korean people
21st-century South Korean people